Abreu Vineyards is a winery in Napa Valley, California founded by the viticulturist David Abreu.

History
David Abreu, a third-generation rancher from St. Helena, California founded Abreu Vineyards in 1980. Abreu Vineyards first vintage was made in 1986 but the first release was not until the 1987 vintage, which was made available to consumers. Eventually, intuition and experience led him to four single vineyard properties: Madrona Ranch, Cappella, Las Posadas (formerly Howell Mountain), and Thorevilos. He planned and planted each one. Alongside Brad Grimes, a chef turned winemaker, he whittles one hundred barrels down to just 12,000 bottles of Cabernet Sauvignon blends.

In 1980, David formed David Abreu Vineyard Management, working with pioneering winemaker Richard Forman to manage ranching operations at Inglenook Winery. Abreu and Forman became friends and traveled frequently to Bordeaux, where they observed French winemaking operations.  They brought back French rootstock, trellis designs, and Bordelais planting and farming techniques.

Abreu's fame spread as other wineries hired Abreu's company to plant and manage ranching operations. By 1999 he was considered the premier viticulturist for premium grapes in Napa Valley.  David Abreu Vineyard Management has farmed grapes for some of the most respected wineries in Napa Valley including Blankiet Estate, Staglin Family Vineyards, Jones Family Vineyards, Bressler Vineyards, Colgin Cellars, Pahlmeyer Vineyard, Sloan Estate, Bryant Family Vineyard, Fisher Vineyards, Oakford Vineyards, Araujo Estate Wines, Grace Family Vineyards, Viader Vineyards, and Harlan Estate, among others.  In 2006 Abreu was hired to replant vineyards at Screaming Eagle Winery and Vineyards. 
.

Wine
Abreu's label concentrates exclusively on estate-grown Cabernet Sauvignon blends. Distribution is extremely limited and sold primarily to members on their direct mailing list. A number of online retails offer Abreu Vineyards wine, from unknown sources, with prices ranging from $400 to $800 or more per 750ml.

In 1998 wine critic Robert Parker included Abreu in his list of the "most influential wine personalities of the last 20 years". Parker awarded the 1997 Madrona Ranch cabernet a 100-point score, one of only 140 wines in the world to receive the honor. As of the 2013 vintage, Abreu Vineyards holds nine, 100-point scores from Robert Parker's Wine Advocate.

In the "Judgment of Sauternes" of October, 2006, the 1995 vintage Cabernet blend was judged the winner among Cabernet-Merlot blends from Bordeaux and California, 16 each, in a blind tasting arranged by the Grand Jury Européen. In the late 1990s Abreu and Forman jointly leased and planted the  Thorevilos Vineyard. They released Abreu's first cabernet from that vineyard in 2000.

References

External links

Wineries in Napa Valley
Companies based in Napa County, California
St. Helena, California
1980 establishments in California